is a Japanese heavyweight kickboxer from Tokyo, currently competing in K-1.

Biography
Sawayashiki, at only 19 years old, turned pro in 2004 and started fighting for R.I.S.E. kickboxing promotion in Japan. He made his K-1 debut on December 2, 2006 at the K-1 WGP 2006 Final undercard, against Mitsugu Noda, winning the fight by split decision.

On his next fight in Yokohama he stunned the K-1 world by a convincing victory over French kickboxing legend Jerome Le Banner.

After three consecutive wins at Yokohama, Hawaii and Amsterdam Sawayashiki earned himself a wildcard entry to the K-1 Final Elimination against the K-1 Asia winner Yusuke Fujimoto. After having his nose broken in the first round, Sawayashiki fought on and knocked down Fujimoto three times in the third round before referee stopped the fight.

His next fight was at the K-1 World GP 2007 Final against 3-Time World Champion, Peter Aerts. He suffered his first K-1 loss by first round Knockout after taking a tremendous right punch to the face. Sawayashiki's career went downhill from there, losing 4 more straight fights in a row, 3 KO losses to Musashi, Cătălin Moroșanu and Glaube Feitosa plus a punishing three round fight against Jerome Lebanner in the 2008 Final 16. Many now consider Sawayashiki's career short lived and likely over.

Titles 
2006 3rd J-NETWORK Heavyweight champion (May 17, 2006 - June 18, 2007)

Kickboxing record

See also 
List of male kickboxers
List of K-1 events

References

External links
Official K-1 website
Junichi Sawayashiki K-1 profile

1984 births
Living people
Japanese male kickboxers
Heavyweight kickboxers
Japanese male judoka
Sportspeople from Tokyo